The 1996 UEFA Cup Final was a two-legged association football match contested by Bayern Munich of Germany and Bordeaux of France to determine the winner of the 1995–96 UEFA Cup. This was the only UEFA Cup final during the 1990s to not feature any Italian sides and Bordeaux became the only team in the competition's history to reach the final from qualifying through the UEFA Intertoto Cup.

The first leg was played at the Olympiastadion in Munich on 1 May 1996, and the second leg was played two weeks later at Parc Lescure in Bordeaux. Bayern won the first leg 2–0 and the second leg 3–1 to record a 5–1 aggregate victory. With this victory, Bayern became the third club to have won all three major European trophies (European Cup/UEFA Champions League, UEFA Cup/UEFA Europa League, and the Cup Winners' Cup).

Route to the final

Match details

First leg

Second leg

See also
1995–96 UEFA Cup
FC Bayern Munich in international football competitions
FC Girondins de Bordeaux in European football

External links
1995–96 season at UEFA.com

2
International club association football competitions hosted by Germany
International club association football competitions hosted by France
FC Bayern Munich matches
FC Girondins de Bordeaux matches
1996
1995–96 in German football
Final
May 1996 sports events in Europe
Football in Bavaria
Sports competitions in Munich
1990s in Munich